Jonathan Bachini (born 5 June 1975) is an Italian former footballer who played as a midfielder.

Club career
In his earlier years, Bachini was considered a promising midfielder, even making two appearances for the Italy national football team in 1998, under manager Dino Zoff; an offensive winger with good feet and goalscoring ability, he was known in particular for his speed, work-rate, strength, and stamina. Throughout his club career, Bachini played for Lecce, Udinese, Juventus F.C., Brescia, Parma, and Siena, in Serie A. While at Juventus he helped them win the 1999 UEFA Intertoto Cup.

On 3 July 2001, he joined Parma from Juve as part of Gianluigi Buffon's deal. However, Bachini returned to Brescia on loan in September 2001, with Aimo Diana moved to opposite direction. The loan was renewed in June 2002. In July 2003 Brescia finally signed Bachini outright, along with Parma teammate Matuzalém.

Drug bans
On 22 September 2004 Bachini tested positive for cocaine usage while at Brescia; on 25 November 2004, he was suspended for 9 months. Following the termination of his suspension, he was acquired by Siena in 2005; in January 2006, however, Bachini's urine sample collected from the match against Lazio on 4 December 2005 tested positive for cocaine again, and as a result, he was banned for life by the Italian Football Federation (FIGC) as of 10 January 2006.

See also
List of sportspeople sanctioned for doping offences

References

External links
Serie A profile 

1975 births
Living people
Italian footballers
Italy under-21 international footballers
Italy international footballers
Sportspeople from Livorno
Serie A players
Serie B players
S.S. Juve Stabia players
U.S. Lecce players
Udinese Calcio players
Juventus F.C. players
Brescia Calcio players
Parma Calcio 1913 players
A.C.N. Siena 1904 players
Italian sportspeople in doping cases
Doping cases in association football
Association football midfielders
Sportspeople banned for life
Footballers from Tuscany